Kalaripayattu is an Indian martial art developed in present-day Kerala in the southwestern coast of the Indian subcontinent. It is featured in several films, television, literature, video games, comics and other media.

Films

Television

Documentaries
 The Way of the Warrior on BBC
 Fight Quest (season 2)

Cartoons
Little Kalari Warriors by Toonz Animation India for Cartoon Network.

Video games
 Ashwathama — The Immortal
 Soul Edge
 Death Battle
 Tekken

Comics
 Agari (2019), Japanese manga. 
 Odayan
 Odayan II – Yuddham
 Alita - Battle Angele

Music videos
 Higher by Just Blaze and Baauer, featuring Jay-Z; directed by Nabil Elderkin.

See also 
List of martial arts films
Martial arts film

References 

Kalarippayattu films
Kalarippayattu films
 
Kalarippayattu films
Martial arts television series
Indian television-related lists

fr:Kalaripayat
pt:Kalaripayatu